Lac d'Aude is a lake in Pyrénées-Orientales, France. At an elevation of 2136 m, its surface area is 0.03 km².

Aude